On December 20, 2020, a shooting incident occurred in Paniqui, Tarlac, Philippines, when a police officer, Jonel Nuezca, fatally shot two of his neighbors, Sonia and Frank Gregorio, after a heated argument over an improvised noisemaker (boga). The victims' relatives and the perpetrator's underage daughter were present at the scene of the crime and witnessed the incident. The incident was caught on camera and went viral on social media, sparking nationwide outrage and reigniting the discussion over police brutality and human rights violations in recent years.

Background
According to World Population Review, data from 2020 shows that the Philippines ranked third among the countries with the highest cases of police killings with 3,451 have been recorded after Brazil and Venezuela. During the time of his administration, Former President of the Republic of the Philippines, Rodrigo Duterte, has made remarks on ordering the police to shoot-to-kill. However Duterte has adamantly denied its correlation to the incident, saying it doesn't mean to "shoot" civilians.

People involved

Jonel Nuezca
Jonel Montales Nuezca (October 17, 1974 – November 30, 2021), confirmed dead on December 1, 2021. Nuezca was a native of Urdaneta, Pangasinan, but resided in Barangay Cabayaoasan, Paniqui, Tarlac. He had been previously charged with two homicide cases and multiple administrative cases. Based on a document retrieved from PRO III Chief P/Brig. Gen. Val de Leon, Nuezca was also suspended for 10 days from his job from February 19 to 28, 2010. In 2014, a "less serious neglect of duty" case was filed against Nuezca for allegedly refusing to take a drug test. He was then sentenced to 31 days suspension. In 2013, Nuezca was charged with an administrative case and grave misconduct, which was dropped. In 2016, Nuezca was also charged with "serious neglect of duty" for allegedly not attending a court hearing as a prosecution witness in a drug case; the case was also dropped and closed. Nuezca had two serious misconduct and homicide cases in May and December 2019, but both charges were dismissed due to "lack of substantial evidence".

Sonia and Frank Anthony Gregorio a.k.a Anton
Sonia Rufino Gregorio was 55 years old and her son, Frank, was 25 years old at the time of their deaths. Both were residents of Barangay Cabayaoasan, Paniqui, Tarlac.

Incident and investigation

The incident started when Nuezca had gone to investigate the Gregorios who were setting up a boga – an improvised noisemaker cannon either made of bamboo, a PVC pipe, or linkage of opened tin cans. When Nuezca tried to arrest Frank Anthony "Anton" Gregorio, who appeared to be drunk, his mother, 55-year-old Sonia intervened by holding her son back, which then resulted in a heated argument that escalated until Nuezca fatally shot the two victims. According to Police Colonel Renante Cabico, director of the Tarlac Provincial Police Office, Nuezca was "off duty" at the time of the incident.

The circumstances of the incident was captured on camera: It shows Nuezca (in civilian clothes), accompanied by his daughter, rushing to the Gregorio family's house. Nuezca was holding the boga he confiscated. At this point, it then shows Sonia hugging her 25-year-old son Frank. The woman was trying to prevent her son from engaging in an argument with civilian police officer Nuezca. People in the background can be heard begging, crying and screaming. At one point, the police told the people not to interfere and wait for the barangay officials. Nuezca's daughter, 12-year old Elisha, was also at the scene and intervened by yelling "My father is a policeman!" to Sonia, then Sonia yelled back "I don't care!". The artists of the K-pop song of the same title by 2NE1, tweeted that they were sympathetic of the victims, after the song trended due to reactions on social media. Nuezca threatened to kill the woman right before shooting her in the head; he then shot Frank twice and Sonia again, when she was already lying on the ground, in front of Nuezca's daughter and the relatives of the victims. According to the Paniqui Municipal Police, the suspect immediately fled the crime scene and went to his parents' house in Urdaneta, Pangasinan. Nuezca was also assigned to the Parañaque City Crime Laboratory and had just returned to Paniqui, Tarlac.

The incident was reported to the police 20 minutes later and, at 6:19 p.m., Nuezca surrendered himself to a police station in Rosales, Pangasinan where he relinquished his firearms. A day after the incident, Lt. Col. Noriel Rombaoa, chief of Paniqui Municipal Police Station, said that Nuezca had admitted his crime following his surrender to the police. Nuezca was charged with double murder.  The Philippine National Police (PNP) assured that there would be no "whitewashing" in the investigation. The PNP said that they will resolve the incident within 30 days. They added that if Nuezca is found guilty, he will be disqualified from his duty and will lose his income.

Before the shooting, according to the victims' relatives, the family had preexisting dispute over the right of way sold by the police officer to the family of the victims.

Reactions

Social media
A day after the incident, numerous netizens and celebrities condemned the killings on social media with the hashtags #StopTheKillingsPH, #PulisAngTerorista ("Police Are Terrorists"), #EndPoliceBrutality and #JusticeForSonyaGregorio dominating on Twitter in the Philippines, as well as in Singapore and Dubai. The K-pop song "I Don't Care" by South Korean girl group 2NE1, in which Sonia yelled back the song's hook at the policeman's daughter moments before she was murdered, came into resurgence together with the name of the K-pop girl group on Twitter.

Personal information, including photos of Elisha Nuezca, also circulated on social media. This caused UNICEF Philippines to issue a public advisory to discourage the spread of such information on social media where Elisha has been "repeatedly vilified and verbally abused".

Government
Interior Secretary Eduardo Año condemned the incident, vowing the government would file the criminal cases against Nuezca. Año also added that the incident should not lead the condemnation of the entire police. Presidential Spokesperson Harry Roque said that President Rodrigo Duterte, who supports the police under his administration, will not protect Nuezca because of his crimes. Duterte himself watched the viral video of the shooting. Senator Bong Go said that Duterte was angered at the incident. Malacañang vowed to bring justice for the victims of the shooting. On the same day, Duterte ordered the PNP to make sure that the suspect face punishment. The president characterized Nuezca as "sick in the head". Duterte added that he will not condone police officers who commit such crimes. Police Captain Ariel Buraga of Bato, Catanduanes was relieved from duty after he commented on social media justifying the shooting of the Gregorios.

On December 22, PNP Chief Debold Sinas personally visited the wake of the Gregorios.

Politics
Lawmakers from both the Senate and the House of Representatives condemned the killing of mother-and-son. House Speaker Lord Allan Velasco expressed sympathy to the victims and said that Nuezca must be punished. Senator Franklin Drilon stated that the suspect should "spend Christmas and a lifetime in jail" and called the incident "pure evil." Senator Leila de Lima was angered over the incident, calling it "appalling and shocking" while adding Duterte's name in her statement. Senator Francis Pangilinan said the incident was "infuriating". Other senators condemned the incident, including Risa Hontiveros, Nancy Binay and Joel Villanueva. Senator Panfilo Lacson, who is a former Philippine National Police (PNP) chief, condemned the shooting and called the police to hold Nuezca responsible. The police called the incident an "isolated case." On the other hand, Senators Ronald dela Rosa, also a former PNP chief, Bong Revilla, and Manny Pacquiao considered the "reinstitution of the death penalty." Dela Rosa also expressed belief that Nuezca is a "drug addict" because of the latter's refusal to do the drug testing. Meanwhile, ACT Teachers Representative France Castro and GABRIELA Representative Arlene Brosas directly blamed Duterte for the crime, citing human rights violations committed under Duterte administration. Senators Joel Villanueva, Sonny Angara, Nancy Binay, Grace Poe, Juan Miguel Zubiri and Sherwin Gatchalian filed Senate Resolution No. 600 that probes into the recent killings in the country under Duterte's administration. Vice President Leni Robredo slammed the culture of impunity following the shooting.

Protests

An indignation rally was done by numerous groups on December 21, 2020, at the Boy Scout Circle, Quezon City.

Religious groups
Tarlac Bishop Enrique Macaraeg condemned the shooting and added that God promises justice "even if sometimes justice on earth is hard to find."

Aftermath
A wake for the two victims was held a day after the incident. Personnel of the  Commission of Human Rights from the region visited the wake. Former senator Jinggoy Estrada also visited the wake. Twelve members of the Gregorio family who witnessed the murder of the mother-and-son were subjected to counseling. While being detained, Nuezca issued an apology for his crimes but the Gregorio family did not accept the apology. The mother-and-son were buried on December 27, 2020.

On January 10, 2021, Nuezca pleaded "not guilty" to his charges. The PNP dismissed Nuezca from his duty the following day.

On August 26, 2021, Nuezca was found guilty by the Paniqui, Tarlac Regional Trial Court, sentencing him reclusión perpetua for each count of murder and owing the victims' family a ₱952,560 fine.

On November 30, 2021, Nuezca died while in captivity at the New Bilibid Prison in Muntinlupa, Metro Manila, after he collapsed while walking outside his dormitory building. His death was confirmed by the Bureau of Corrections the following day. He was 47 years old at the time of his death. The cause of death was found to be a heart attack.

In popular culture
The case was featured on GMA Network's investigative docudrama program Imbestigador in an episode entitled "Gregorio Double Murder Case". Jonel Nuezca was portrayed by Carlos Agassi, while Sonia and Anton Gregorio were portrayed by Mel Kimura and Martin del Rosario, respectively.

On December 22, 2020, Filipino folk-pop band Ben&Ben wrote the song "Kapangyarihan", which was posted on Facebook, and issued a statement on the killing on Twitter. The song would eventually become part of their second album, Pebble House, Vol. 1: Kuwaderno, with additional lyrics by Filipino boy band SB19, released in August 2021, the same time Nuezca was found guilty.

Notes

References

2020 murders in the Philippines
Filmed killings by law enforcement
2020 shooting
Human rights abuses in the Philippines
Police brutality in the 2020s
December 2020 crimes in Asia
December 2020 events in the Philippines
Duterte administration controversies